Keine Sorgen EisArena is an indoor sporting arena located in Linz, Austria. The Donauhalle has been called the "Keine Sorgen EisArena" since 2008 as a result of a sponsorship deal with an Austrian insurance group. The arena has a capacity of 4,863 people, with around 1,000 seats and was built in 1986. It is currently home of the EHC Black Wings Linz ice hockey team.

Donauhalle also refers to an exhibition complex in Ulm, Germany.

References

Indoor ice hockey venues in Austria
Sports venues in Upper Austria
Sports venues completed in 1986
1986 establishments in Austria
20th-century architecture in Austria